Rob Ehrens (born 30 October 1957) is a Dutch equestrian. He competed in two events at the 1988 Summer Olympics.

References

External links
 

1957 births
Living people
Dutch male equestrians
Olympic equestrians of the Netherlands
Equestrians at the 1988 Summer Olympics
Sportspeople from Limburg (Netherlands)